The insect family Coenagrionidae is placed in the order Odonata and the suborder Zygoptera.
The Zygoptera are the damselflies, which although less known than the dragonflies, are no less common. More than 1,300 species are in this family, making it the largest damselfly family. The family Coenagrionidae has six subfamilies: Agriocnemidinae, Argiinae, Coenagrioninae, Ischnurinae, Leptobasinae, and Pseudagrioninae.

This family is referred to as the narrow-winged damselflies or the pond damselflies. The Coenagrionidae enjoy a worldwide distribution, and are among the most common of damselfly families. This family has the smallest of damselfly species. More than 110 genera of the family Coenagrionidae are currently accepted.

Etymology
The name may be derived from Greek coen meaning shared or common and agrio meaning fields or wild.

Characteristics

 Usually have a black pattern
 Ground color may be green, blue, yellow, orange, or purple
 Narrow, stalked, usually colorless and clear wings
 Two antenodal cross veins
 Vein M3 arising nearer to nodus than arculus

Adults are seen around various habitats including ponds and wetlands. The females lay their eggs among living or dead submerged vegetation, and in some species, even crawl about underwater depositing their eggs. The nymphs are usually found in debris or among living or dead submerged plant material.

Genera

These genera belong to the family Coenagrionidae:

 Acanthagrion Selys, 1876
 Acanthallagma Williamson & Williamson, 1924
 Aceratobasis Kennedy, 1920
 Aciagrion Selys, 1891
 Aeolagrion Williamson, 1917
 Africallagma Kennedy, 1920
 Agriocnemis Selys, 1877
 Amazoneura Machado, 2004
 Amphiagrion Selys, 1876  (red damsels)
 Amphiallagma Kennedy, 1920
 Amphicnemis Selys, 1863
 Andinagrion Bulla, 1973
 Angelagrion Lencioni, 2008
 Anisagrion Selys, 1876
 Anomisma McLachlan, 1877
 Antiagrion Ris, 1904
 Apanisagrion Kennedy, 1920
 Archibasis Kirby, 1890
 Argentagrion Fraser, 1948
 Argia Rambur, 1842  (dancers)
 Argiocnemis Selys, 1877
 Austroagrion Tillyard, 1913
 Austroallagma Lieftinck, 1953
 Austrocnemis Tillyard, 1913
 Austrocoenagrion Kennedy, 1920
 Austrotepuibasis Machado & Lencioni, 2011
 Azuragrion May, 2002
 Bromeliagrion De Marmels, 2005
 Caliagrion Tillyard, 1913
 Calvertagrion St. Quentin, 1960
 Ceriagrion Selys, 1876
 Chromagrion Needham, 1903  (aurora damsels)
 Coenagriocnemis Fraser, 1949
 Coenagrion Kirby, 1890  (Eurasian bluets)
 Coryphagrion Morton, 1924
 Cyanallagma Kennedy, 1920
 Denticulobasis Machado, 2009
 Diceratobasis Kennedy, 1920
 Dolonagrion Garrison & von Ellenrieder, 2008
 Drepanoneura von Ellenrieder & Garrison, 2008
 Enacantha Donnelly & Alayo, 1966
 Enallagma Charpentier, 1840  (American bluets)
 Epipleoneura Williamson, 1915
 Epipotoneura Williamson, 1915
 Erythromma Charpentier, 1840
 Fluminagrion Anjos-Santos, Lozano & Costa, 2013
 Forcepsioneura Lencioni, 1999
 Franciscagrion Machado & Bedê, 2016
 Franciscobasis Machado & Bedê, 2016
 Hesperagrion Calvert, 1902  (painted damsels)
 Hivaagrion Hämäläinen & Marinov, 2014
 Homeoura Kennedy, 1920
 Huosoma Guan, Dumont, Yu, Han & Vierstraete, 2013
 Hylaeonympha Rácenis, 1968
 Idioneura Selys, 1860
 Inpabasis Santos, 1961
 Ischnura Charpentier, 1840  (forktails)
 Junix Rácenis, 1968
 Lamproneura De Marmels, 2003
 Leptagrion Selys, 1876
 Leptobasis Selys, 1877  (swamp damsels)
 Leptocnemis Selys, 1886
 Leucobasis Rácenis, 1959
 Luzonobasis Villanueva, 2012
 Mecistogaster Rambur, 1842
 Megalagrion McLachlan, 1883
 Megaloprepus Rambur, 1842
 Melanesobasis Donnelly, 1984
 Mesamphiagrion Kennedy, 1920
 Mesoleptobasis Sjöstedt, 1918
 Metaleptobasis Calvert, 1907
 Microstigma Rambur, 1842
 Millotagrion Fraser, 1953
 Minagrion Santos, 1965
 Mortonagrion Fraser, 1920
 Nehalennia Selys, 1850  (sprites)
 Neoerythromma Kennedy, 1920  (yellowfaces)
 Neoneura Selys, 1860  (robust threadtails)
 Nesobasis Selys, 1891
 Oreiallagma von Ellenrieder & Garrison, 2008
 Oreocnemis Pinhey, 1971
 Oxyagrion Selys, 1876
 Oxyallagma Kennedy, 1920
 Pacificagrion Fraser, 1926
 Pandanobasis Villanueva, 2012
 Papuagrion Ris, 1913
 Paracercion Weekers & Dumont, 2004
 Pericnemis Selys, 1863
 Peristicta Hagen in Selys, 1860
 Phasmoneura Williamson, 1916
 Phoenicagrion von Ellenrieder, 2008
 Pinheyagrion May, 2002
 Plagulibasis Lieftinck, 1949
 Platystigma Kennedy, 1920
 Proischnura Kennedy, 1920
 Proneura Selys, 1889
 Protallagma Kennedy, 1920
 Protoneura Selys in Sagra, 1857
 Psaironeura Williamson, 1915
 Pseudagrion Selys, 1876
 Pseudostigma Selys, 1860
 Pyrrhosoma Charpentier, 1840
 Roppaneura Santos, 1966
 Sangabasis Villanueva, 2012
 Schistolobos von Ellenrieder & Garrison, 2008
 Stenagrion Laidlaw, 1915
 Teinobasis Kirby, 1890
 Telagrion Selys, 1876
 Telebasis Selys, 1865  (firetails)
 Tepuibasis De Marmels, 2007
 Thaumatagrion Lieftinck, 1932
 Tigriagrion Calvert, 1909
 Tuberculobasis Machado, 2009
 Tukanobasis Machado, 2009
 Vanuatubasis Ober & Staniczek, 2009
 Xanthagrion Selys, 1876
 Xanthocnemis Tillyard, 1913
 Xiphiagrion Selys, 1876
 Zoniagrion Kennedy, 1920

See also
 List of damselflies of the world (Coenagrionidae)

References

External links
 Info and Photos at BugGuide
 Images from Georgia, US
 
 

 
Odonata families
Odonata of Australia
Odonata of Oceania
Odonata of Asia
Odonata of Africa
Odonata of North America
Taxa named by William Forsell Kirby
Insects described in 1890
Damselflies